Jerry Silver is an American neuroscientist and professor in the Department of Neurosciences at Case Western Reserve University School of Medicine. He is known for his research using rat models to develop treatments for spinal cord injuries. He became a fellow of the American Association for the Advancement of Science in 2011.

References

External links
Faculty page

Living people
American neuroscientists
Case Western Reserve University faculty
Case Western Reserve University alumni
Fellows of the American Association for the Advancement of Science
Year of birth missing (living people)